This 1982 television movie, starring Lee Remick, Ronald Pickup, Jack Thompson, Ian McShane and Christopher Cazenove and directed by John Erman. It is the third film version of the 1927 play of the same title by W. Somerset Maugham.

It screened as part of ABC Theatre.

Cast
Lee Remick as Leslie Crosbie
Ronald Pickup as Howard Joyce
Jack Thompson as Robert Crosbie
Ian McShane as Geoff
Christopher Cazenove as Officer Withers
Kieu Chinh as Chinese Woman
Wilfrid Hyde-White as Judge
Sarah Marshall as Dorothy Joyce
Soon-Tek Oh as Ong
James Hong as Old Man
Molly Roden as Warden Larkin

Production
Remick's casting was announced in April 1981. The story had been filmed twice before but Remick said "our version is different because we actually show what happened rather than relying on the woman's explanation."

Reception
The Chicago Tribune called it "wickedly wonderful."

The Los Angeles Times called it "quite remarkable...literate, sumptuously produced, beautifully acted."

Awards
Remick was nominated for the Golden Globe Award for Best Actress – Miniseries or Television Film.

The film won the Primetime Emmy Award for Cinematography for a Limited Series or a Special, Costume Design for a Special, and Art Direction for a Limited Series or a Special. Laurence Rosenthal was nominated for Music Composition for a Limited Series or a Special (Dramatic Underscore).

References

External links
 The Letter at IMDb.com
The Letter at Letterbox DVD

1982 television films
1982 films
ABC network original films
Films directed by John Erman